Ooredoo Tunisia is a private telecommunications company in Tunisia. Set up with capital of 330 million Tunisian dinars, it was founded on 11 May 2002. Ooredoo Tunisia is part of the Ooredoo Group. With over 7.5M subscribers, it is the largest operator in Tunisia.

History
Ooredoo Tunisia started commercial operations on 27 December 2002. Six months later, its mobile phone network covered 60% of the Tunisian population. As of June 30, 2006, it had more than 2.5 million subscribers and has now more than 5 million subscribers. As of 2005, the network covered 99% of the population. In early-2006, Ooredoo Tunisia launched GPRS and EDGE on the Tunisian market.

On 24 May 2012 the company secured licenses to deliver 3G and fixed services. Tunisiana changed its branding to Ooredoo Tunisia on 24 April 2014.

The CEO of the company is Youssef Al Masri.

References

External links 
 Official website

Tunisia
Telecommunications companies of Tunisia
Telecommunications companies established in 2002
2002 establishments in Tunisia